The term tank graveyard or tank cemetery refers to an area containing a number of derelict armored vehicles, generally as a result of warfare.

While they often are only a last resting place for destroyed, broken down or outdated equipment, tank graveyards can be a source of parts to produce new or restored vehicles. Ukraine has for instance been able to field hundreds of new tanks to fight in the Russo-Ukrainian War by cannibalizing those sitting in graveyards since the Soviet era.

Notable tank graveyards
Vukovar, Croatia (Battle of Vukovar, Croatian War of Independence)
Kabul, Afghanistan (Soviet–Afghan War)
Khemkaran, India (1965 India Pakistan War)
Chawinda, Pakistan (1965 India Pakistan War)
Longewala, India (1971 India Pakistan War )
Highway of Death, north of Kuwait City, Kuwait (1991, Operation Desert Storm)
Asmara, Eritrea (Eritrean War of Independence)

References

Graveyard
Vehicle graveyards